James Patterson Lyke, O.F.M. (February 18, 1939 – December 27, 1992) was an African-American prelate of the Catholic Church who served as Archbishop of Atlanta from 1991 to 1992. He was the second-ever Black archbishop in America.

Biography

Early life 
James Lyke was born on the South Side of Chicago, Illinois, the youngest of seven children of Amos and Ora (née Sneed) Lyke. His father abandoned the family, and his mother was left to raise the children in impoverished surroundings, relying on welfare checks. The family lived in a flat, where there were no beds and the only source of heat was a coal stove, before moving to Wentworth Gardens, a Chicago housing project.

Conversion 
His mother, a Baptist, sent James to a Catholic school in the fourth grade in order to keep him out of trouble, and did the church's laundry to help pay the tuition. Shortly afterwards, she and six of her children, including James, converted to Catholicism.

Religious life 
He joined the Franciscan order in 1959, studying at St. Francis Novitiate in Teutopolis, Illinois, later obtaining his B.A. degree in philosophy at Our Lady of Angels House of Philosophy through Quincy College in Illinois. He received a master's of divinity from St. Joseph Theological Seminary in Teutopolis.

Episcopacy
Pope John Paul II named him Auxiliary Bishop of Cleveland and titular bishop of Furnos Major on June 30, 1979. He obtained a Ph.D. in theology in 1981 from the Union Graduate School in Cincinnati, Ohio.

While serving as Auxiliary Bishop in the Diocese of Cleveland, Lyke coordinated the group that produced Lead Me, Guide Me: The African American Catholic Hymnal in 1987.

After the resignation of Archbishop Eugene Marino due to scandal, Lyke was appointed Apostolic Administrator of the Archdiocese of Atlanta on July 10, 1990. He was appointed archbishop there on April 30, 1991, and was installed there on June 24, 1991.

Death 
Lyke died of cancer on December 27, 1992. At the time of his death, he was the highest-ranking Black Catholic clergyman in the nation.

Legacy
A number of institutions in the United States have been named in Lyke's memory, including:
Lyke House - the Catholic Newman Center at the Atlanta University Center.
 Archbishop Lyke Catholic Elementary School in Cleveland -  In 1994, Saints Catherine and Henry in Cleveland and Saint Timothy in Garfield Heights, which are predominantly African-American Catholic parishes, merged their grade schools into Archbishop Lyke Elementary. They have a two-campus system in which St. Henry has grades K-4 and St. Timothy grades 5-8.
Archbishop Lyke Conference - A Black Catholic liturgical conference held each year in a different major city, including pre-conferences on preaching, music ministry, dance, and young adults.

References

1939 births
1992 deaths
African-American Roman Catholic bishops
Roman Catholic Diocese of Cleveland
20th-century Roman Catholic archbishops in the United States
Clergy from Chicago
Converts to Roman Catholicism from Baptist denominations
Roman Catholic Archdiocese of Atlanta
American Friars Minor
Franciscan bishops
Deaths from cancer in Georgia (U.S. state)
Roman Catholic archbishops of Atlanta
Catholics from Illinois
African-American Roman Catholic archbishops
African-American Catholic consecrated religious